Cetrelia chicitae is a species of foliose lichen in the family Parmeliaceae. It is found in eastern Asia, North America, and Europe, where it grows on mossy rocks and tree trunks.

Taxonomy
It was first formally described in 1965 by American lichenologist William L. Culberson as Cetraria chicitae. The type specimen was collected in Gaudineer Knob, a mountain summit in eastern West Virginia. The taxon was transferred to the new genus Cetrelia in 1968. The specific epithet chicitae honours Culberson's wife Chicita Culberson, also a lichenologist.

Description
The thallus surface features white soredia, powdery to coarsely granular in form, that lie on the lobe margins. Pseudocyphellae are present on the upper thallus surface; they are mostly within 0.15–0.6 mm in diameter. The thallus undersurface is black to brown, sometimes with blotches of ivory colour at the margins. Rhizines are sparse (usually absent at the margins) and black.

Secondary chemicals found in the lichen include atranorin, found in the upper cortex, and alectoronic and α-collatolic acids, present in the medulla.

Habitat and distribution
The lichen grows on both mossy boulders and tree trunks. In east Asia it has been found in Korea, Japan, and Sakhalin. Its North American distribution extends from New Brunswick west to southern Ontario and south to Tennessee and North Carolina. It has been recorded from various locales in Europe, although it is relatively uncommon there. Cetrelia chicitae is critically endangered in Poland.

References

Parmeliaceae
Lichen species
Lichens of Asia
Lichens of Europe
Lichens of North America
Lichens described in 1965
Taxa named by William Louis Culberson